James Moore House may refer to:

James Moore House (Woodland, California), listed on the NRHP in Yolo County, California
 House on Ellicott's Hill, Natchez, Mississippi, also known as James Moore House, a U.S. National Historic Landmark
James Moore House (Pasco, Washington), listed on the NRHP in Franklin County, Washington

See also
Moore House (disambiguation)